Superformatting is the process of formatting a floppy disk at a capacity that the disk is not designed for. It can ruin a floppy disk, but it is used in some floppy-based Linux distros to increase the room for applications and utilities. muLinux is a notable example of this technique. Another common use (which is not as popular nowadays) was to format low-density 3.5-inch or 5.25-inch floppies as high-density, or in the case of 3.5-inch disks, even extra-high density (HD-36).

"Notched" disks will usually turn up a lot of bad sectors, especially if the formatted capacity is a considerable (1.5 to 3) number of times higher than intended. Superformatting is usually done with a low-level format (such as "FORMAT /U" in DOS and "fdformat" in Linux.)

References 

Floppy disk computer storage